Avenue Foch station (French: Gare de l'Avenue Foch) is a station in the Paris express suburban rail system, the RER. It is in the 16th arrondissement of Paris.  It had previous been called Avenue du Bois de Boulogne as part of the Auteuil line, but was renamed following the change to the road itself. The station was once a "sunken" station, meaning that it was not covered.

Adjacent station 
 Porte Dauphine on Paris Métro Line 2 is within walking distance.

Tourism 
 Bois de Boulogne
 Musée de la Contrefaçon

See also 
 List of stations of the Paris RER
 List of stations of the Paris Métro

External links 
 

Réseau Express Régional stations
Railway stations in Paris
Railway stations in France opened in 1854
Buildings and structures in the 16th arrondissement of Paris